is a Japanese politician of the Liberal Democratic Party, a member of the House of Representatives in the Diet (national legislature).

Overviews 

A native of Chiba, Chiba and graduate of Chuo University,  he was elected for the first time in 1980 after an unsuccessful run in 1979. In 1996 he served as Director General of the Japan Defense Agency.

References

External links 
  in Japanese.

|-

|-

|-

|-

|-

Japanese defense ministers
Ministers of Justice of Japan
Members of the House of Representatives (Japan)
Chuo University alumni
People from Chiba (city)
1939 births
Living people
Liberal Democratic Party (Japan) politicians
21st-century Japanese politicians